Grim's Ditch or Grim's Dyke or Grimes Dike is a linear earthwork in the London Borough of Harrow, in the historic county of Middlesex, and lends its name to the gentle escarpment it crowns, marking Hertfordshire's border. Today the remaining earthworks start mid-way at Harrow Weald Common.

Attributes

Paths
A high path, Old Redding, an old high way passes through the centre of the ridge and includes a map-marked viewpoint. Other extensive views through breaks in trees are a few hundred yards further up the "high road".

North Basin high point
The immediate London basin resembles London's present county: three boroughs furthest south reach into the North Downs broad escarpment; those opposing take as their northern edge a broken ridge, low in the north-east, high in the north-west, namely the Grim's Ditch.  The two highest ridges in London run along the southern edge of London (namely with Westerham, Kent and Woodmansterne, Surrey). The next highest point is Stanmore Hill along the Grim's Ditch, where London adjoins Bushey, Hertfordshire.

Views
Many parts of Central London can be seen, including the Shard London Bridge, which exceeds the height of all hills in London and the Home Counties. 
Beyond Harrow on the Hill to the south, Leith Hill can be seen (and its 20-metre-high tower through binoculars). 
To the north and west are the Chilterns, and in particular Coombe Hill, Buckinghamshire can be seen.

The highest point of the trail, is close to the county top of the historic county of Middlesex, above Grim's Dyke Golf Club on the 'Bushey Heath Walk' footpath. The walk reaches a small wood with a landmark BT microwave aerial, close to the fencing of which is a stone marker placed and worked by the Harrow Heritage Trust that reads:

This ancient earthwork once stretched through Harrow for six miles from Cuckoo Hill, Pinner to Pear Wood, Stanmore, but now only parts remain. Named after Grim (another name for the English King (also the god of death), Woden).'

Hotel and film location

In the woods stands Grim's Dyke, a house designed in 1870 by Norman Shaw for the Victorian painter Frederick Goodall. Later, it was the country home of W. S. Gilbert (of Savoy opera fame) – he suffered a heart attack and drowned while trying to save a swimmer in the lake in the grounds. It is now an hotel and is often used as a film setting. The house and gatehouse are listed buildings.

History
Grim's Dyke may have been built by the Catuvellauni tribe as a defence against the Romans. or as a boundary marker. An excavation in 1979 in the grounds of the Grim's Dyke Hotel gave a radiocarbon date of 50 AD ± 80 years, for a heath in the bank which suggests an Iron Age or Roman date. There is another earthwork close by in Pear Wood, Brockley Hill that has been suggested as an eastern continuation of the Grim's Dyke. This monument is of Roman or post-Roman date and runs at ninety degrees to Watling Street.

Trivia
The earthwork gave its name to the telephone exchange for Stanmore. The legacy is the first three numbers of many local landlines.

References
Notes

References

Archaeological sites in London
Archaeological sites in Hertfordshire
Parks and open spaces in the London Borough of Harrow
Hills of Hertfordshire
Ancient dikes
History of the London Borough of Harrow
Linear earthworks